La calle de los suspiros ("Street of Sighs") is a historical street located at Colonia del Sacramento, Uruguay.

The street was listed as a World Heritage Site by UNESCO in 1995.

Streets in Uruguay
World Heritage Sites in Uruguay
Colonia del Sacramento
Portuguese colonial architecture in Uruguay